Wales-only laws are Acts of the United Kingdom Parliament that only relate to Wales. Each law would then either grant the devolved legislature of Wales power to make delegated legislation or would transfer power to the Senedd (Welsh Parliament) to make Senedd Acts (formerly Assembly measures) in certain devolved areas.

Wales-only Laws are part of the contemporary Welsh law powers as they relate to Wales alone, but are not enacted by the devolved legislature of Wales, but by the UK Parliament only.

Laws

Welsh Language Act 1993

This puts the Welsh language on an equal footing with the English language in Wales with regard to the public sector. Welsh can also be spoken in Welsh courts. The National Assembly for Wales passed the Proposed Welsh Language (Wales) Measure 2011, making the Welsh language an officially recognised language within Wales, and setting up related bodies and regulations.

References

 
Government of Wales
Welsh laws